The JRD Tata Sports Complex Stadium, also known as The Furnace is a 40,000-capacity (often limited to 24,424) stadium in Jamshedpur, India. It is currently used mostly for association football matches and athletics competitions. It has been the home stadium of Jamshedpur FC since the 2017–18 season. The stadium holds 24,424-40,000 spectators for sports matches (depending on the event).

History 

The JRD Tata Sports Complex is the largest sports arena in Jamshedpur, India. The sports complex is also used for conducting the Annual Sports Day of many reputed schools in Jamshedpur.

On 5 January 2007, the stadium was also a venue of having prominent performers, such as, Shankar Mahadevan, Ehsaan Noorani, Loy Mendonsa, and Mahalaxmi Iyer, performed to mark the final day of Tata Steel's four-day celebration of its centenary year, event known as 'Shatrang'.

Apart from that a significant exhibition football match was played between São Paulo FC from Brazil and Mohammedan S.C. from India in 2007.

Currently, it is the home ground for Hero ISL based team, Jamshedpur FC. This stadium also holds the record of 2nd highest average home attendance for Jamshedpur FC in Hero ISL's 2017-18 season, and also holds the record of 1st highest average home attendance for Jamshedpur FC in 2018-19 ISL season.

Facilities 
As a multi-use stadium, it provides athletes facilities to board, train and compete in the same sports arena. The complex has an international size football pitch with an eight-lane mono-synthetic running track around the field.

It is primarily used for football and athletics but it has facilities for various other sports including Archery, Basketball, Field Hockey, Handball, swimming, Table Tennis, Tennis, Volleyball. It has a full service fitness center which is free for resident athletes and is accessible to the citizens of Jamshedpur for a fee. The sports complex is also the headquarters for the Tata Chess Centre and Tata Archery Academy. It also has a world class swimming pool in it complex.

 Archery
 Basketball
 Field Hockey
 Football
 Handball
 Table Tennis
 Tennis
 Track and Field
 Swimming
 Volleyball
 Relay
 Marching
 Kabbadi
 Shooting
 Boxing
 Martial arts
 Chess
 Yoga
 Karate
 Athletics
 Badminton
 and others

References

Football venues in Jharkhand
Athletics (track and field) venues in India
Sport in Jamshedpur
Sports venues in Jharkhand
Field hockey venues in India
Tata Group
Sports venues completed in 1991
1991 establishments in Bihar
Neighbourhoods in Jamshedpur
20th-century architecture in India